Childs is an unincorporated community in Wilkin County, in the U.S. state of Minnesota.

History
The town of Childs was named for a local farmer, Job W. Childs, who later moved to California.  The town had a post office from 1888 until 1920, and a station of the Great Northern Railway which was abandoned in 1956.

Notes

Unincorporated communities in Wilkin County, Minnesota
Unincorporated communities in Minnesota